This page covers all relevant details regarding Cherno More for all official competitions inside the 2017–18 season. These are the First Professional Football League and the Bulgarian Cup.

Due to the ongoing repair works at Ticha Stadium, the team played its first home league game at Kavarna Stadium in Kavarna.

On 21 September 2017, following a streak of poor results and Bulgarian Cup elimination by Montana, manager Georgi Ivanov resigned. Assistant coach Emanuel Lukanov was immediately appointed as caretaker manager.  As results didn't improve, on 28 December he was replaced with Ilian Iliev, his second tenure as Cherno More manager.

Transfers

In

Out

Loans out

Squad information

Competitions

Overall

Competition record

Minutes on the pitch
Includes injury time.  Positions indicate the most natural position of the particular player, followed by alternative positions where he actually started games during the course of the season.

Correct as of match played on 24 May 2018.

Goalscorers

Last updated: 24 May 2018

Clean sheets

Last updated: 20 April 2018

Own goals

Man of the Match performances 

Last updated: 19 May 2018
Source: Match reports in Competitions, Gong.bg Man of the Match Awards

Disciplinary record 
Correct as of 24 May 2018
Players are listed in descending order of 
Players with the same amount of cards are listed by their position on the club's official website

Suspensions served

Injuries
Players in bold are still out from their injuries.  Players listed will/have miss(ed) at least one competitive game (missing from whole match day squad).

Home attendances
Correct as of match played on 16 May 2018.

{| class="wikitable sortable" style="text-align:center; font-size:90%"
|-
!width=160 | Competition
!width=120 class="unsortable" | Date
!width=60 | Score
!width=250 class="unsortable" | Opponent
!width=150 | Attendance
|-
|First League||15 July 2017 ||bgcolor="#CCFFCC"|1–0 ||Vitosha Bistritsa ||250
|-
|First League||28 July 2017 ||bgcolor="#CCFFCC"|1–0 ||Dunav Ruse ||2,480
|-
|First League||11 August 2017 ||bgcolor="#FFFFCC"|1–1 ||Slavia Sofia ||1,830
|-
|First League||27 August 2017 ||bgcolor="#FFCCCC"|1–4 ||Septemvri Sofia ||1,630
|-
|First League||16 September 2017 ||bgcolor="#FFCCCC"|0–1 ||CSKA Sofia ||6,500
|-
|First League||23 September 2017 ||bgcolor="#FFFFCC"|0–0 ||Etar ||1,650
|-
|First League||14 October 2017 ||bgcolor="#FFCCCC"|0–1 ||Ludogorets Razgrad ||3,980
|-
|First League||5 November 2017 ||bgcolor="#FFCCCC"|1–2 ||Vereya ||780
|-
|First League||24 November 2017 ||bgcolor="#FFCCCC"|0–1 ||Pirin Blagoevgrad ||610
|-
|First League||2 December 2017 ||bgcolor="#FFFFCC"|0–0 ||Botev Plovdiv ||780
|-
|First League||17 February 2018 ||bgcolor="#FFCCCC"|1–4 ||Beroe ||1,380
|-
|First League||7 March 2018 ||bgcolor="#FFCCCC"|2–3 ||Levski Sofia ||3,080
|-
|First League||18 March 2018 ||bgcolor="#FFCCCC"|0–1 ||Lokomotiv Plovdiv ||780
|-
|First League||30 March 2018 ||bgcolor="#CCFFCC"|2–1 ||Pirin Blagoevgrad ||1,300
|-
|First League||13 April 2018 ||bgcolor="#CCFFCC"|2–0 ||Vitosha Bistritsa ||740
|-
|First League||20 April 2018 ||bgcolor="#CCFFCC"|2–0 ||Slavia Sofia ||660
|-
|European play-off quarter-finals||5 May 2018 ||bgcolor="#CCFFCC"|2–1 ||Septemvri Sofia ||770
|-
|European play-off semi-finals||16 May 2018 ||bgcolor="#CCFFCC"|2–1 ||Lokomotiv Plovdiv ||1,250
|-
|bgcolor="#C0C0C0"|
|bgcolor="#C0C0C0"|
|bgcolor="#C0C0C0"|
| Total attendance
|30,450
|-
|bgcolor="#C0C0C0"|
|bgcolor="#C0C0C0"|
|bgcolor="#C0C0C0"|
| Total league attendance
|30,450
|-
|bgcolor="#C0C0C0"|
|bgcolor="#C0C0C0"|
|bgcolor="#C0C0C0"|
| Average attendance
|1,692
|-
|bgcolor="#C0C0C0"|
|bgcolor="#C0C0C0"|
|bgcolor="#C0C0C0"|
| Average league attendance
|1,692

Club

Coaching staff
{|class="wikitable"
!Position
!Staff
|-
|-
|Manager|| Georgi Ivanov (until 21 September) Emanuel Lukanov (21 September–28 December) Ilian Iliev (from 28 December)
|-
|Assistant First Team Coach|| Ivaylo Petrov (until 21 September) Petar Kostadinov (from 28 December)
|-
|Assistant First Team Coach|| Emanuel Lukanov (until 21 September)
|-
|Goalkeeper Coach|| Stoyan Stavrev (until 28 December) Boyan Peykov (from 28 December)
|-
|First Team Fitness Coach|| Veselin Markov
|-
|Individual Team Fitness Coach|| Viktor Bumbalov
|-
|Medical Director|| Dr. Petko Atev
|-

Other information

References

PFC Cherno More Varna seasons
Cherno More Varna